Makazole Drex Mapimpi (born 26 July 1990) is a South African professional rugby union player for the South Africa national team and the  in the United Rugby Championship. He usually plays as a winger and centre. He was part of the winning Springboks of the 2019 Rugby World Cup in Japan. He became the first South African to score a try in a World Cup Final.

Biography
Mapimpi was born and raised in a rural and very poor environment. At the 2019 Rugby World Cup, South African players are invited to provide photos of their family that will be integrated into the flocked numbers on the back of their jersey. On this occasion, Mapimpi is the only one to give only a picture of him. When Rassie Erasmus, the coach, asks him why, he admits having nobody left. His parents, as well as his siblings, all passed away.

Career

Youth

As a child, Mapimpi grew up in the Tsholomnqa village. In 2009, Mapimpi was a member of the  team.

Border Bulldogs

Mapimpi was one of several amateur club players brought into the  provincial set-up at the start of 2014 after the professional side was declared bankrupt. Border lost the match 46–24, but Mapimpi marked his first-class debut with a try shortly after half-time. He also started in their 6–60 loss to Eastern Cape rivals  and their next match against Kenyan invitational side , scoring the Border Bulldogs' second try in that match to help them to an 18–17 win, their only victory of the competition.

However, the Border Bulldogs lost all six of their matches to finish bottom of the log and qualified to the 2014 Currie Cup First Division.

Mapimpi returned in the 2015 Vodacom Cup, but ended up on the losing side in their first six matches in the seven-match competition. He finished the match with a personal haul of 24 points in the Border Bulldogs' 29–5 victory to help them overtake the Boland Cavaliers on the Southern Section log.

Mapimpi also scored a try three minutes from the end of the Border Bulldogs' first match of the 2015 Currie Cup qualification tournament, with his side causing an upset by beating  – the team that won the qualification tournament in 2014 to earn a spot in the 2014 Currie Cup Premier Division – 20–13 in a match played in East London.

Free State Cheetahs

In April 2017, the  announced that they contracted Mapimpi until the end of the 2018 season.

International career 
Mapimpi made his test debut for the Springboks on 2 June 2018 against Wales in Washington, D.C. at the age of 27.

Mapimpi was in the team that won the 2019 Rugby World Cup under the leadership of Siya Kolisi, where he scored 6 tries including two in the 2019 Rugby World Cup quarter final match against Japan in a 26–3 victory. and one in the final against England. Mapimpi is the first player in the history of Springboks to score a try in a Rugby World Cup final. The previous Springboks World Cup wins were without tries.

As of 3 September 2022, Mapimpi has the rare achievement of having scored a try against every team he has played in international rugby.

Statistics

Test match record 

Pld = Games played, W = Games won, D = Games drawn, L = Games lost, Try = Tries scored, Pts = Points scored

International tries

References

External links
 

1990 births
Living people
People from Mdantsane
South African rugby union players
Rugby union centres
Rugby union wings
Border Bulldogs players
Southern Kings players
South Africa international rugby union players
Free State Cheetahs players
Cheetahs (rugby union) players
Sharks (rugby union) players
Sharks (Currie Cup) players
NTT DoCoMo Red Hurricanes Osaka players
Rugby union players from the Eastern Cape